Kinyerezi II Thermal Power Station is a , natural gas powered, electricity generating power station in Tanzania.

Location
The power plant is located in Kinyerezi Ward, in Ilala District, in Dar es Salaam, the commercial capital and largest city in Tanzania. The plant lies adjacent to the  gas-fired power station, Kinyerezi I Thermal Power Station.

Overview
Kinyerezi II Power Station is owned and operated by Tanesco, the Tanzanian electricity distribution monopoly. It was constructed between March 2014 and April 2018, by Sumitomo Corporation, partially funded by loans from Sumitomo Mitsui Banking Corporation and the Japan Bank for International Cooperation. The power generated is evacuated via high-voltage cables to a nearby substation, where it is integrated into the Tanzanian national electricity grid. The power plant operates on natural gas.

In October 2018, The EastAfrican, an English daily newspaper reported that the expansion of Kinyerezi II was complete and commissioning of the expanded power station was imminent.

Future plans
While Kinyerezi II's capacity is being increased to 240 megawatts, the government of Tanzania has plans to expand Kinyerezi I Power Station from the current 150 megawatts to 335 megawatts, by February 2019. There are other plans to build two new gas-fired plants; Kinyerezi III (600 megawatts) and Kinyerezi IV (450 megawatts).

Funding
The funding of the construction of Kinyerezi II Power Plant, is as depicted in the table below:

See also
Tanzania Electric Supply Company Limited 
List of power stations in Tanzania
Economy of Tanzania

References

External links
Website of Tanesco

Power stations in Tanzania
Dar es Salaam
Energy infrastructure completed in 2018
2018 establishments in Tanzania